Abdellah Bounfour (born 1946) is a Moroccan linguist and philologist specialized in Berber languages, literature and culture. He is an Emeritus University Professor at Institut national des langues et civilisations orientales (INALCO) in Paris.

Biography 
Bounfour was born in 1946, a native of the Glaoua, a Berber tribe of the High Atlas of Marrakesh. He studied at the University of Paris III: Sorbonne Nouvelle, where he received his Doctorat de troisième cycle in 1976 and a Doctorat d'Etat in 1984. He got the agrégation of Arabic in 1986. He worked as a Maître de conférences at the Mohammed V University in Rabat from 1976 to 1984, serving as head of the Department of French Language and Literature from 1979 to 1981 and curator of the library of the Faculty of Arts of Rabat from 1981 to 1983. Then from 1987 to 1997, as a Maître de conférences at the Bordeaux Montaigne University. He is the Director of LACNAD (Langues et Cultures du Nord de l'Afrique et Diasporas) and LACNAD-CRB (Centre de Recherche Berbère) since January 2010. He has been a member of the Encyclopédie berbère Editorial Board since 2002 at the invitation of Salem Chaker.

Notable Works

References 

1946 births
Berberologists
Berber scholars
Linguists from Morocco
Living people
Moroccan academics
University of Paris alumni
Moroccan expatriates in France